Mojette beans or Mogette beans are white beans native to the New World and traditionally eaten in the French department of Vendée in the region of Pays de la Loire. They are smooth, fine and almost rectangular.

Mojette beans are traditionally eaten on a grilled slice of bread with unsalted butter and, optionally, ham from Vendée.

References

External link

Phaseolus
French cuisine